Hyams is a surname. Notable people with the surname include:

 Chapman H. Hyams (1838–1923), stockbroker, businessman and philanthropist
 Eban Hyams (born 1981), Indian-born Australian professional basketball player
 Edward Hyams (1910–1975), British writer
 Godfrey M. Hyams (1859–1927), American financier and philanthropist
 Harry Hyams, English millionaire and real estate developer
 Henry M. Hyams (1806–1875), Lieutenant Governor of Louisiana from 1862 to 1864.
 Joe Hyams, American columnist and author
 John Hyams, American filmmaker
 Leila Hyams, American actress
 Margie Hyams, American vibraphonist
 Nina Hyams (born 1952), American professor of linguistics
 Peter Hyams, American film director
 Simone Hyams (born 1971), British actress
 Tony Hyams (born 1945), Australian businessman
 Tor Hyams, songwriter

See also
 Hyams Beach
 Hyams Corporation in the Xenosaga games
 Haim, includes people with the given name Hyam
 Higham (surname), includes people with the surname Hyam